Steve Anthony (born Stephen Anthony Gomes on 2 April 1959 in Montreal, Quebec) is a former Canadian broadcaster. He gained attention throughout Canada as a MuchMusic host, or "VJ" from May 1987 to November 1995.

In 1986, Anthony moved from Montreal's CKGM to take the drive shift on Toronto's Q107. He left the following year to join MuchMusic.

Anthony was a weekday afternoon host on Toronto radio station 99.9 Mix FM, prior to its August 2008 conversion to the Virgin Radio format. He was also a panelist on the 2006 program MuchMusic VJ Search, a competition of prospective hosts for MuchMusic.

In 2009, he hosted a weekend show on Sirius Satellite Radio channel Iceberg 85 and also co-hosted Too Much '80s with Erica Ehm via Astral Media's Orbyt radio syndication service.

Beginning in March 2009, Anthony started working at CP24 (and CP24 Breakfast) as a news reporter on the CP24 news chopper, known as Chopper 24. From September 2009 until March 2018, Anthony was the co-host of CP24 Breakfast.

Anthony is also the Radio Imaging voice of many radio and television stations in North America. His voice can be heard on stations including SiriusXM NHL Network Radio, Faith-FM and more.

Anthony has been awarded with the Top Choice Award for three consecutive years.

Anthony announced that he would leave CP24 on March 29, 2018 in order to pursue projects outside of broadcasting. On August 15, 2018 Anthony announced his appointment as Head of Media Relations and member of the Advisory Board at Direct Global / Direct Co-ops.

Career 
 mid-1980s: CKGM-AM, Montreal
 1986-1987: CILQ-FM (Q107), Toronto - radio afternoon show
 1987-1989: CFNY-FM, Toronto - radio morning show
 1987-1995: MuchMusic - VJ
 1989- 1994?: Citytv, Toronto - co-host, Breakfast Television
 1998-2001: CHOM-FM, Montreal - radio morning show
 2001: MuchMusic, 2001: A Space Road Odyssey - television special
 2001-2003: Mix 99.9, Toronto - radio morning show with Carla Collins
 2003-2008: Mix 99.9, Toronto - radio afternoon show
 2006: MuchMusic, VJ Search - panelist
 2009: CP24 - Chopper 24 news reporter
 2009-2018: Co-host of CP24 Breakfast
 2015: Narrates Battle Factory
 2018: Appointed Head of Media Relations at Direct Global / Direct Co-ops

References

External links 
 Steve Anthony's Official Webpage

 The Spirit of Radio: Steve Anthony
 
 
 Yahoo group: Radio in Montreal: Steve Anthony leaving CHOM-FM, 20 May 2001
 Steve Anthony's bio from the VJ Search website
 Celebrity Spaces: Steve Anthony
 Steve Anthony and his home audience
 CP24 Host Steve Anthony Kicks Truck, Has Hip Replaced (VIDEO)
 INTERVIEW: STEVE ANTHONY REFLECTS ON MUCHMUSIC’S 30TH ANNIVERSARY
 Steve Anthony is Surgically Hip
 5 of the original MuchMusic VJs are reunited in 2013

1959 births
Living people
Anglophone Quebec people
Canadian radio hosts
Much (TV channel) personalities
Participants in Canadian reality television series
People from Montreal
Canadian VJs (media personalities)